Malin Alegria is an American author of Youth literature, who primarily focuses on the genre of young adult novels.

Written work and topics 
Her first book Estrella's Quinceañera deals with a girl's struggle between a traditional quinceañera and an American-style Sweet 16 birthday party. It is based in San Jose, California. Estrella's Quinceañera was published by Simon & Schuster in 2006.

It has been recommended by educators and librarians as a way of teaching tolerance and youth voices 

Alegria also wrote Sofi's Guide To Getting Lost in Mexico  in which Sofi Mendoza goes to a party in TJ (Tijuana) to hook up with her biggest crush but finds out her green card is fake.  Then she has to endure cooking, cleaning and a truck that smells like Chinese food.

Malin is currently at work on a teen book series for Scholastic, "Border Town", about a fictional town in South Texas.

Malin conducts readings across the United States.

Bibliographical Resources 
https://faculty.ucmerced.edu/mmartin-rodriguez/index_files/vhAlegriaMalin.htm

Personal life
Malin Alegria currently resides in San Francisco California and Albuquerque, New Mexico.

Citations

References 
 QUINCEAÑERA, The Monterey County Herald. By Marc Cabrera. Apr 16, 2006
 Kids' Corner, Entertainment Weekly. Mar 14, 2006 EW Review
 BookList, American Library Association. February 15, 2006

External links
 Official Website
 KPFA Radio Interview
 Estrella's Quinceañera Library of Congress Entry
 NPR Author Page

American young adult novelists
American women novelists
Living people
American writers of Mexican descent
Hispanic and Latino American novelists
21st-century American novelists
21st-century American women writers
Women writers of young adult literature
Year of birth missing (living people)